"Chubbie Chumps" is an episode of the British comedy television series The Goodies.

This episode is also known as "Radio 2" and "The Beauty Contest" as well as "Housewives" and "Miss Housewife".

Written by The Goodies, with songs and music by Bill Oddie.

Plot
Graeme and Bill return from their weekend fishing trip to discover that the office hasn’t been cleaned and Tim has become obese through eating huge amounts of lard.  Tim has also taken to listening to two radio shows, Jimmy Young's cooking show and a mysterious smooth talking disc jockey named Terry which as it turns out, is also listened to by a lot of housewives (all of whom have also become obese), and this leads the group (Tim included) to a health club, where they slim down again.

Meanwhile, Bill and Graeme are cleaning the office themselves, before Tim comes back from the health club. They find that Tim is slim again with a feminine look. He continues listening to the radio and Terry the disc jockey announces a Beauty pageant for housewives, called Miss Housewife of the Year, on Friday night at the Royal Albert Hall. Tim enters the contest, but Graeme forbids him to go to the pageant because he's not a housewife - not even a miss - but it was no use.  Tim walks off to make himself pretty for the pageant instead of listening to his friends. Graeme is left holding the telephone while Terry the disc jockey is still on the line and says "Hello, darling?". Graeme answers back "Don't you 'darling' me, mate!" and makes comments about the Terry's scheme for  manipulating the housewives to enter his 'rotten contest'. Graeme forces the Terry into accidentally admitting that he doesn't want any fat women in the pageant, leading to him getting fired for his vile comments. Then, the BBC makes an announcement to hire a new disc jockey, Graeme has an idea to change the Beauty Pageant and takes the job.

Graeme becomes a radio announcer, and does all the voices of other disc jockeys. Bill tries to convince Tim that Graeme is on the radio and believes he's gone mad with power. Then, Bill hears about the prize money. Graeme makes further instructions to the housewives which make them fat again (Tim wants to also join in, but is prevented from doing so by Bill).

On Friday night at the Albert Hall, the beauty contest has started with Graeme welcoming all the obese housewives. The milkmen judges and other men are not impressed with them. Then Tim (Mrs. Cricklewood), who has stayed slim, becomes the winner of Housewife of the Year. Tim and Bill are happy to win the contest but Graeme is displeased with Bill's misunderstanding of his plan. The housewives become angry with the Goodies and chase them to get the prize cup. By the time the trio gets exhausted from running, they notice that the housewives have lost all their fat and become slim again while on the run, so the Goodies blow the dresses off the housewives (leaving them dressed in their underwear). Then the tune for The Benny Hill Show is heard as the Goodies dressed as dirty old men chase all the housewives around the park.

Cultural references
 Beauty contest
 Health club
 The Benny Hill Show — where the ending music and chase of the Benny Hill Show is used as the ending music and chase for the episode.
ISIRTA chalked on the wall; this was the radio sketch show in which Bill, Tim and Graeme also starred. ISIRTA was the acronym frequently used for the full title of the radio series: I'm Sorry I'll Read That Again.

References

 "The Complete Goodies" — Robert Ross, B T Batsford, London, 2000
 "The Goodies Rule OK" — Robert Ross, Carlton Books Ltd, Sydney, 2006
 "From Fringe to Flying Circus — 'Celebrating a Unique Generation of Comedy 1960-1980'" — Roger Wilmut, Eyre Methuen Ltd, 1980
 "The Goodies Episode Summaries" — Brett Allender
 "The Goodies — Fact File" — Matthew K. Sharp

External links
 
 ("Chubbie Chumps" is listed under an alternative title at IMDb)

The Goodies (series 5) episodes
1975 British television episodes
Television episodes about obesity